Tropojë Lake is a small mountain lake in the Prokletije mountains in western Kosovo, only 180m from the Albanian border. The lake has an oval shape and is 100m in length and 40m in width. Rivers that originate on this lake flow downwards to join larger rivers and then finally flow into the White Drin.

Notes and references 

Lakes of Kosovo
Lakes of Serbia
Accursed Mountains